Free UK Genealogy is a charitable incorporated organisation (CIO) acting as an umbrella organisation for FreeBMD, FreeREG and FreeCEN. The charity was formerly known as FreeBMD.

Free UK Genealogy works with volunteers to make transcriptions of family history records. Current projects include transcribing the England and Wales index of Births Marriages and Deaths, historic Parish Registers and 19th Century Censuses. The resulting databases FreeBMD, FreeCEN and FreeREG and transcripts are free to access.

Formation of Free UK Genealogy from FreeBMD 
FreeBMD was founded in 1998 by Ben Laurie, Graham Hart and Camilla Gemmingen von Massenbach after they realised the potential that the online genealogy community had to make records accessible to support research. Volunteers came together online to transcribe the General Register Office (GRO) indexes of Births, Marriages and Deaths for England and Wales. Work continues to complete a transcription database covering the indexes from 1837 to 1983. All three founders are still actively involved with supporting and managing the organisation.
 In 2003 the organisation registered as a charity under the name FreeBMD
 In 2014 the name was changed to Free UK Genealogy which better reflected the organisation
 In 2016 Free UK Genealogy became a CIO (Charitable Incorporated Organisation)

Governance 
In 2013 Darren Wright was appointed executive director, in succession to Nick Barratt.

Pat Reynolds is the current executive director, in post since June 2015.

Ethos and mission 
Free UK Genealogy is a supporter of Open Data and Open Source as key to making and keeping public records accessible to all.

In 2011 FreeBMD partnered with the Open Rights Group and Open Knowledge Foundation to launch the Open Genealogy Alliance (OGA). The OGA researches the genealogy sector and the copyright status of digitised public domain documents.

Free UK Genealogy work is generally licensed under the Creative Commons CC0 Public Domain Dedication, as described in the footer of the website.

Awards and recognition 
In 2007, FreeBMD was awarded the Prince Michael of Kent Award by the Society of Genealogists. The same year, The Guardian selected FreeBMD as one of the 50 best family history websites.

Family Tree Magazine named Free UK Genealogy among the 101 Best websites for British & Irish Genealogy in 2016.

In June 2017, Free BMD was selected as one of UK Family Tree magazine's 50 best websites for family history.

Free UK Genealogy's projects are often recommended as a good place to begin researching family history.

Volunteers 
The majority of the work of Free UK Genealogy is carried out by volunteers; from transcribing records to managing the databases. As of March 2016 the organisation had 6,500 active volunteers.

Volunteers are trained and supported in their work.

References

External links 
 http://www.freeukgenealogy.org.uk/ - Website

Charities based in the United Kingdom
Family history societies in the United Kingdom